Achabou is a village in the commune of Tafreg, in Bordj Bou Arréridj Province, northern Algeria.

References

Communes of Bordj Bou Arréridj Province

fr:Tefreg#Localités de la commune